Redolfi is an Italian surname. Notable people with the surname include:

 Alex Redolfi (born 1994), Italian football player
 Attilio Redolfi (1923–1997), Italian-French racing cyclist
 Rodolfo Redolfi (1928–2013), Argentine chess player

Italian-language surnames